Pushkinskaya (lit: "Pushkin station") is a Minsk Metro station. Opened on 3 July 1995.

Gallery 

Minsk Metro stations
Railway stations opened in 1995